Orchesella is a genus of springtails belonging to the family Entomobryidae. This genus includes springtails with subdivided basal antennal segments.

Species
These 96 species belong to the genus Orchesella:

 Orchesella adriatica Stach, 1960
 Orchesella ainsliei Folsom, JW, 1924
 Orchesella ainslieri Folsom, 1924
 Orchesella albofasciata J.Stach, 1960
 Orchesella albosa J.E.Guthrie, 1903
 Orchesella alpa Christiansen & Tucker, 1977
 Orchesella alticola Uzel, 1891
 Orchesella angustistrigata J.Stach, 1960
 Orchesella annulicornis H.B.Mills, 1934
 Orchesella arcuata W.Lindenmann, 1950
 Orchesella ariegica P.Cassagnau, 1964
 Orchesella balcanica J.Stach, 1960
 Orchesella bifasciata H.Nicolet, 1842
 Orchesella bulba Christiansen & Tucker, 1977
 Orchesella bulgarica J.Stach, 1960
 Orchesella bullulata J.A.Mari Mutt, 1984
 Orchesella capillata Kos & F, 1936
 Orchesella capreana Denis, 1931
 Orchesella carneiceps A.S.Packard, 1873
 Orchesella carpatica Ionesco, 1915
 Orchesella caucasica Stach, 1960
 Orchesella celsa Christiansen & Tucker, 1977
 Orchesella chiantica Frati & Szeptycki, 1990
 Orchesella chilensis H.Nicolet, 1847
 Orchesella cincta (Linnaeus, 1758) (hairy-back girdled springtail)
 Orchesella colluvialis Jordana R & Baquero E, 2017
 Orchesella croatica J.Stach, 1960
 Orchesella dallaii Frati & Szeptycki, 1990
 Orchesella delhezi Stomp, 1983
 Orchesella devergens Handschin, 1924
 Orchesella disjuncta Stach, 1960
 Orchesella distincta Carl, 1900
 Orchesella diversicincta Kos & F, 1936
 Orchesella eolia H.Altner, 1961
 Orchesella erpeldingae Stomp, 1968
 Orchesella fishmani K.A.Christiansen & B.E.Tucker, 1977
 Orchesella flavescens (Bourlet, 1839)
 Orchesella flora Christiansen & Tucker, 1977
 Orchesella flosomi Maynard, 1933
 Orchesella folsomi Maynard, 1933
 Orchesella frontimaculata Gisin, 1946
 Orchesella gloriosa Snider, 1997
 Orchesella hexfasciata Harvey, 1951
 Orchesella hoffmanni N.Stomp, 1968
 Orchesella hungarica J.Stach, 1930
 Orchesella imitari Snider, 1997
 Orchesella impavida J.A.Mari Mutt, 1984
 Orchesella intermedia Skorikov, 1899
 Orchesella irregularilineata J.Stach, 1960
 Orchesella jonescoi Denis, 1926
 Orchesella jurassica W.Lindenmann, 1950
 Orchesella kervillei Denis & J-R, 1932
 Orchesella leucocephala Stach, 1923
 Orchesella lineata J.M.Brown, 1926
 Orchesella litoralis Brown, 1925
 Orchesella longifasciata J.Stach, 1960
 Orchesella lucasi Denis, 1925
 Orchesella luteola H.Lucas, 1846
 Orchesella maculosa Ionesco, 1915
 Orchesella maledicta Denis & J-R, 1931
 Orchesella manitobae J.A.Mari Mutt, 1985
 Orchesella mauritanica Lin., 1846
 Orchesella melitensis J.Stach, 1960
 Orchesella mesovoides Baquero E & Jordana R, 2017
 Orchesella montana Stach, 1937
 Orchesella multifasciata Stscherbakow, 1898
 Orchesella nigrescens R.Latzel, 1917
 Orchesella oredonensis P.Cassagnau, 1964
 Orchesella orientalis J.Stach, 1960
 Orchesella palestinensis J.Stach, 1960
 Orchesella pallens (E.A.Maynard, 1951)
 Orchesella pannonica Stach, 1960
 Orchesella pontica Ionesco, 1915
 Orchesella prisojnikiana Kos, 1936
 Orchesella pseudobifasciata J.Stach, 1960
 Orchesella pulchra Stscherbakow, 1898
 Orchesella quadriguttata J.Stach, 1960
 Orchesella quinaria J.A.Mari Mutt, 1984
 Orchesella quinquefasciata (Bourlet, 1842)
 Orchesella ranzii Parisi, 1960
 Orchesella rectangulata J.Stach, 1960
 Orchesella semitaeniata R.Latzel, 1917
 Orchesella simplex P.Cassagnau, 1964
 Orchesella spectabilis Tullberg, 1871
 Orchesella sphagneticola Stach, 1960
 Orchesella sporadica Ellis, 1974
 Orchesella stebaevae M.B.Potapov & A.Kremenitsa, 2008
 Orchesella taurica (Stach, 1960)
 Orchesella texensis Snider, 1997
 Orchesella triglavensis Kos & F, 1936
 Orchesella uzeli Skorikov, 1899
 Orchesella villosa (Linnaeus, 1767)
 Orchesella viridilutea J.Stach, 1960
 Orchesella zaninae Nosek, 1964
 Orchesella zebra Guthrie, 1903
 † Orchesella eocaena Handschin, 1926

References

Springtail genera